In graph theory, a priority matching (also called: maximum priority matching) is a matching that maximizes the number of high-priority vertices that participate in the matching. Formally, we are given a graph , and a partition of the vertex-set  into some  subsets, called priority classes.

Priority matchings were introduced by Alvin Roth, Tayfun Sonmez and Utku Unver in the context of kidney exchange. In this problem, the vertices are patient-donor pairs, and each edge represents a mutual medical compatibility. For example, an edge between pair 1 and pair 2 indicates that donor 1 is compatible with patient 2 and donor 2 is compatible with patient 1. The priority classes correspond to medical priority among patients. For example, some patients are in a more severe condition so they must be matched first. Roth, Sonmez and Unver assumed that each priority-class contains a single vertex, i.e., the priority classes induce a total order among the pairs.

Later, Yasunori Okumura extended the work to priority-classes that may contain any number of vertices.

Jonathan S. Turner presented a variation of the augmenting path method (Edmonds' algorithm) that finds a priority matching in time . Later, he found a faster algorithm for bipartite graphs: the algorithm runs in time

See also 

 Maximum cardinality matching
 Rank-maximal matching

References 

Matching (graph theory)